Felixstowe Ferry is a hamlet in Suffolk, England, approximately two miles northeast of Felixstowe at the mouth of the River Deben with a ferry to the Bawdsey peninsula.

Two Martello towers dominate the sea front.

The Felixstowe Ferry Millennium Green Trust was set up in 2001 to save an area of land from building development and put it to use as a community open space for recreational use. The land became known as the Millennium Green.

Gallery

See also
Bawdsey Ferry
Felixstowe
RAF Bawdsey
Regional Cycle Route 41
Suffolk Coast Path

References

External links

 BBC page, including 360-degree panoramic view
 Felixstowe Ferry page, suffolkchurches.co.uk

Villages in Suffolk
Felixstowe